Adrián Juhász (born 18 November 1989) is a Hungarian rower. He competed in the men's coxless pair event at the 2016 Summer Olympics.

References

External links
 
 

1989 births
Living people
Hungarian male rowers
Olympic rowers of Hungary
Rowers at the 2016 Summer Olympics
Place of birth missing (living people)
World Rowing Championships medalists for Hungary